Rhys Patchell (born 17 May 1993) is a Wales international rugby union player. A fly-half, he plays for Scarlets having previously played for Cardiff Blues.

Early life
Educated at Ysgol Gymraeg Melin Gruffydd and at Ysgol Gyfun Gymraeg Glantaf. Patchell speaks Welsh, and is an ambassador for the government-supported "Tafwyl" Welsh-language festival.

Club career
Patchell graduated from the Blues Academy into the full regional side at an early age in 2012 and went on to score more than 600 points in a five-year stint at the Arms Park that saw him make 83 appearances. He scored 174 points in the 2015/16 season to top the Guinness Pro12 charts.

Patchell joined Scarlets in 2016 and it proved to be a shrewd move as he ended his first season as the leading points scorer in the Guinness Pro12 once again with 145. Patchell picked up a winners' medal, helping the west Walians beat Munster in the 2017 Pro12 Grand Final at the Aviva Stadium.

Patchell suffered a series of injuries between 2019 and 2021, limiting his involvement with both the Scarlets and Wales. He returned to full fitness in early 2022, featuring frequently for the Scarlets during the latter half of their season, and continuing his involvement into the 2022–23 United Rugby Championship.

International career
In January 2013 Patchell was selected in the Wales U20 squad for the 2013 U20 Six Nations Championship. 

In May 2013 he was selected for the Wales national rugby union team for the summer 2013 tour to Japan. He made his international debut against Japan on 8 June 2013, and played again in the reverse fixture the following week. Patchell had to wait three years before he won his next cap, and made his first start, after being called out to New Zealand as a replacement for the 2016 summer tour. He came on as a replacement in the midweek game against the Chiefs and started at full-back in the last two Tests with the All Blacks.

Patchell moved into his favoured No 10 shirt for the first two games of the 2018 Six Nations campaign, a home win over Scotland on his tournament debut and an away defeat to England, before dropping to the bench for the win over Italy. He was back at No 10 for the two wins over Argentina on the 2018 summer tour, scoring 30 points in the two games, and then notched his first international try in the home win over Tonga in November, 2018.

Patchell was selected in the Welsh squad for the 2019 Rugby World Cup. He replaced Dan Biggar early in the pool stage match against Australia, kicking a conversion, three penalties, and a drop goal as Wales won 29–25.

Patchell played in the rearranged Six Nations fixture against Scotland in October 2020.

International tries

References

External links

 Cardiff Blues profile
 Scarlets profile

1993 births
Living people
Cardiff Rugby players
Rugby union players from Penarth
Wales international rugby union players
Welsh rugby union players
Welsh-language broadcasters
Scarlets players
Rugby union fly-halves